Bridge of Sighs  is a 2007 novel written by Richard Russo. Bridge of Sighs  is Russo's first novel since his Pulitzer Prize-winning novel Empire Falls (2002).

Plot summary

The novel is set in a small, fictional town in upstate New York called Thomaston. Like Empire Falls, the town is quickly deteriorating.  The story is about Louis Charles ("Lucy") Lynch, his family, his wife, and his best friend. Sixty-year-old Lou Lynch has cheerfully spent his entire life in Thomaston, New York, married to the same woman, Sarah. He is the proprietor of three convenience stores.

2007 American novels

Alfred A. Knopf books
Novels set in New York (state)

References